J. P. Kaushik was a music director in the Hindi film industry. He composed music/songs for over 50 Hindi, Haryanvi, Rajasthani and English films.

Kaushik died, aged 93, on 14 March 2017.

Filmography

Hindi 
Shehar Aur Sapna (1963), produced and directed by K. A. Abbas
Hamara Ghar (1964), produced and directed by K. A. Abbas
Aasmaan Mahal (1965), produced and directed by K. A. Abbas
Bambai Raat Ki Bahon Mein (1968), produced and directed by K. A. Abbas
Saat Hindustani (1969), produced and directed by K. A. Abbas
Basti Aur Bazar (1973), produced and directed by Rajdeep
Dhamaka (1980), produced by Sukhdev Dhamija, directed by Jagdish
Sister (1980), produced by Harish Kataria, directed by Rajdeep
Saanjhi (1985), produced by Sumitra-Satish, directed by Pradeep Hooda

In addition, his Hindi films included:

Aankhin Dekhi, which was censored in 1978 but not released. It was written, produced and directed by Rajinder Singh Bedi
 Adhura Milan ( Incomplete ) Anisha Productions P Ltd...Songs were penned down by Anu Vikshat and sung by Mahendra Kapoor..Nitin Mukesh..Bhupender Singh ( Bhupendra ) Dilraj Kaur ..Bhal Singh and Ved Saini.Kishti Lagi Kinaare was incompleteBandar Mera Saathi, produced by Indian Film Children SocietyLav Kush, produced by Indian Film Children Society

 Gujarati Maari Laaj Rakhje Veera Rajasthani Dharam BhaiLaado Rani Haryanvi Bahurani , produced by Haryanvi Film Co-operative Society, directed by Satish J. KaushikChandrawalPanghatLambardaarDhan ParayaBatehoo, directed bySharmaPhool BadanTaqdeer Ki TaqraarLaaddo BasantiBairiChandrakiranChhori Sapele KiChhori Natt Ki. produced by Anurag Sharma, directed by Jack GaudKunbaa Television MadhurimaInsaani Rishton Ka SafarAnmol RattanOfficer On Special Duty Documentaries Pageants Of IndiaTales Of Four CitiesSumitra Nandan Pant''

References 

Indian film score composers